Bożenna Bukiewicz, née Lickiewicz  (born 14 February 1952 in Żary) is a Polish politician. She was elected to the Sejm on 25 September 2005 getting 11,237 votes in 8 Zielona Góra district as a candidate from the Civic Platform list.

See also
Members of Polish Sejm 2005–2007

External links
Bożenna Bukiewicz - parliamentary page - includes declarations of interest, voting record, and transcripts of speeches.

Members of the Polish Sejm 2005–2007
Women members of the Sejm of the Republic of Poland
Civic Platform politicians
1952 births
Living people
People from Żary
21st-century Polish women politicians
Members of the Polish Sejm 2007–2011
Members of the Polish Sejm 2011–2015